The 2018 Super League season, known as the Betfred Super League XXIII for sponsor reasons, was the 23rd season of the Super League and 124th season of rugby league in Britain. It was won by Wigan Warriors, who were crowned champions after beating Warrington Wolves 12-4. It was Wigan's 22nd Championship win and a new record for being champions. They are now 9 titles ahead of the next team.	

Twelve teams competed over 23 rounds, including the Magic Weekend, which took place at St James' Park, Newcastle upon Tyne, after which the eight highest entered the Super League play-offs for a place in the Super League Grand Final. The four lowest teams then entered the qualifying play-offs, along with the four highest teams from the Championship, to determine which teams will play again in Super League XXIV.

Leeds Rhinos were the reigning champions going into the season, but after a run of 10 games without a win, they were condemned to The Qualifiers.

This season also saw the first Super League game played outside Europe, as Wigan Warriors faced Hull F.C. at WIN Stadium in Wollongong, Australia on Saturday 10 February 2018, which Wigan won, 24–10.

St. Helens won the League Leaders Shield for a record 6th time. However, they failed to reach the Grand Final after losing their semi final 13-18 to Warrington Wolves. This marked the first time since Huddersfield in 2013 that the League Leaders would not make it to the Grand Final.

Widnes Vikings were relegated to the Championship, after only 3 wins saw them finish bottom of the regular season and condemned to The Qualifiers. To which they only managed to gain 1 win, which was against Halifax.

London Broncos won the Million Pound Game by beating Toronto Wolfpack 4–2 and were promoted to the Super League, returning to Super League 4 years after they were relegated.

Ben Barba was crowned the Man of Steel, beating teammate James Roby and John Bateman of Wigan Warriors.

Teams
Eleven teams in Super League are from the North of England. Five teams hail from the historic county of Lancashire, west of the Pennines: Warrington, St. Helens, Salford, Wigan, and Widnes.  Six teams hail from the historic county of Yorkshire, east of the Pennines: Huddersfield, Wakefield Trinity, Leeds, Castleford, Hull KR and Hull FC. Catalans Dragons, located in Perpignan, France, are the only team outside the North of England. St Helens, Wigan Warriors, Warrington Wolves, and Leeds Rhinos are the only teams to have played in every season of Super League since 1996.

Hull KR were promoted from the Championship after finishing in 2nd place in The Qualifiers for 2017 whilst Leigh were relegated to the Championship after losing the 2017 Million Pound Game to Catalans.

Regular-season results

Regular-season standings

Super 8s

Format
After 23 games the league table is frozen, and the teams are split up into two of Super 8s. The teams finishing in the top eight go on to contest the Super League Super 8s, to determine which teams go through to the semi-final play-offs, to compete for a place in the Super League Grand Final on 13 October. Each teams points are carried over from the previous 23 games, and each teams play each other one more time, a total of seven further games per team.

The Super League Super 8s sees the top eight teams from the Super League, play each other one more time (seven games each). Each team's points are carried over from the previous 23 games, and after seven rounds, the top four teams will then make up the play off semi-finals, with the team finishing first (St. Helens) hosting the team in fourth (Warrington Wolves), and the team finishing second (Wigan Warriors), hosting the team finishing third (Castleford Tigers). The winners of these semi-finals will then contest the Super League Grand Final at Old Trafford on 13 October 2018.

Round 1

Round 2

Round 3

Round 4

Round 5

Round 6

Game moved to Huddersfield, due to Wigan Athletic's fixture with Bristol City, now being played on the same day.

Round 7

Final standings

Playoffs

Grand Final

Final

Wigan Warriors

Wigan finished 2nd in regular season and seven consecutive wins in the Super 8's saw them secure 2nd place in the table. A 14–0 victory over Castleford Tigers in the semi-final earned Wigan a place in their 10th Grand Final.

This is the first time that a team has won all 7 Super 8's games in a single season, and since this playoff format will be abandoned at the end of the 2018 season, will make this a unique historic feat achieved by Wigan.

Warrington Wolves

Warrington finished 4th to earn an away trip to League Leaders Shield winners St. Helens in the semi finals. Warrington won  18-13 with a late try by Tom Lineham. Warrington will be contesting their 4th Grand Final.

Match details

This match was Shaun Wane's last game as Wigan coach before going to Scotland Rugby Union after 7 seasons as head coach of Wigan.

Teams

Player statistics

Top 10 try Scorers

Top 10 try assists

Top 10 goal scorers

Top 10 points scorers

• Updated to match(es) played on 28 September 2018 (Super 8s – Round 7)

Discipline

 Red Cards

 Liam Watts' red card was picked up whilst playing for Hull F.C.

  Yellow Cards

 Weller Hauraki has been sin binned once for Salford, and once for Widnes
 Joel Tomkins' sin bin was picked up whilst playing for Wigan Warriors
 Updated to match(es) played on 22 September 2018 (Super 8s Round 6)

Attendances

Average attendances

Top 10 attendances

Statistics correct as of 27 July 2018 (Round 23)

The Qualifiers

Format

The Qualifiers sees the bottom four teams from Super League join the top 4 teams from the Championship. The points totals are reset to zero and each team plays seven games each, playing every other team once. The teams finishing 1st, 2nd, and 3rd will gain qualification to the 2019 Super League season. The teams finishing 4th and 5th will play in the "Million Pound Game" at the home of the 4th place team to determine who will take the final place to gain promotion to Super League XXIV. The loser, along with teams finishing 6th, 7th and 8th, will be relegated to the Championship.

End-of-season awards

Awards are presented for outstanding contributions and efforts to players and clubs in the week leading up to the Super League Grand Final:

 Coach of the year:  Shaun Wane (Wigan Warriors)
 Foundation of the year:  Leeds Rhinos
 Hit Man:  Paul McShane (Castleford Tigers) (1160 tackles)
 Man of Steel:  Ben Barba (St. Helens)
 Metre-maker:  Bill Tupou (Wakefield Trinity) (4114 Metres)
 Rhino "Top Gun":  Luke Gale (Castleford Tigers)
 Super League Club of The Year:  Warrington Wolves
 Top Try Scorer:  Ben Barba (St. Helens) (28)
 Young player of the year:  Jake Trueman (Castleford Tigers)

Media

Television
2018 is the second of a five-year contract with Sky Sports to televise 100 matches per season.

Sky Sports coverage in the UK will see two live matches broadcast each week, usually at 8:00 pm on Thursday and Friday nights.

Regular commentators will be  Eddie Hemmings with summarisers including Phil Clarke, Brian Carney, Barrie McDermott and Terry O'Connor. Sky will broadcast highlights on Sunday nights on Super League - Full Time at 10 p.m.

BBC Sport will broadcast a highlights programme called the Super League Show, presented by Tanya Arnold. The BBC show two weekly broadcasts of the programme, the first to the BBC North West, Yorkshire, North East and Cumbria, and East Yorkshire and Lincolnshire regions on Monday evenings at 11:35 p.m. on BBC One, while a repeat showing is shown nationally on BBC Two on Tuesday afternoons at 1.30 p.m. The Super League Show is also available for one month after broadcast for streaming or download via the BBC iPlayer in the UK only. End of season play-offs are shown on BBC Two across the whole country in a weekly highlights package on Sunday afternoons.

Internationally, Super League is shown live or delayed on Showtime Sports (Middle East), Sky Sport (New Zealand), TV 2 Sport (Norway), Fox Soccer Plus (United States), Fox Sports (Australia) and Sportsnet World (Canada).

Radio

BBC Coverage:

 BBC Radio 5 Live Sports Extra (National DAB Digital Radio) will carry two Super League commentaries each week on Thursday and Friday nights (both kick off 8pm); this will be through the 5 Live Rugby league programme which is presented by Dave Woods with a guest summariser (usually a Super League player or coach) and also includes interviews and debate..
 BBC Radio Humberside will have full match commentary of all Hull F.C. matches.
 BBC Radio Leeds carry commentaries featuring Leeds, Castleford, Wakefield and Huddersfield.
 BBC Radio Manchester will carry commentary of Leigh, Wigan and Salford whilst sharing commentary of Warrington with BBC Radio Merseyside.
 BBC Radio Merseyside will have commentary on St Helens and Widnes matches whilst sharing commentary of Warrington with BBC Radio Manchester.

Commercial Radio Coverage:

 102.4 Wish FM will carry commentaries of Wigan & St Helens matches.
 107.2 Wire FM will carry commentaries on Warrington Home and Away.
 Radio Yorkshire will launch in March carrying Super League commentaries. 
 Radio Warrington (Online Station) all Warrington home games and some away games.
 Grand Sud FM covers every Catalans Dragons Home Match (in French).
 Radio France Bleu Roussillon covers every Catalans Dragons Away Match (in French).

All Super League commentaries on any station are available via the particular stations on-line streaming.

References

External links
Official Site
BBC Rugby League